Amandus Johnson (October 27, 1877 – June 30, 1974) was a Swedish- American historian, author and museum director. He is most associated with his epic two volume history  The Swedish Settlements on the Delaware 1638-1664, which was also published in Swedish as Den första svenska kolonien i Amerika (1923).

Biography
Amandus Johnson was born at Långasjö in  Emmaboda Municipality, Kalmar, Sweden.  
His family emigrated to America and settled in Rice Lake, Minnesota  in 1880.
Johnson studied at Gustavus Adolphus College and in 1904 took a bachelor's degree.
He earned a master's degree  at the University of Colorado at Boulder.
He received his doctorate in 1908 from the University of Pennsylvania where he wrote his doctoral dissertation Swedish Settlements on the Delaware, 1638-1664 on the Swedish colony of New Sweden. In 1908, Johnson was one of the cofounders of the Swedish Colonial Society.
Amandus Johnson was a senior lecturer in Scandinavian languages at the University of Pennsylvania from 1910-1921.

Johnson was the founding curator of the American Swedish Historical Museum and museum director and curator 1921-1943.  In 1943, he was named Emeritus Curator. Dr. Amandus Johnson served as a governor of the  Swedish Colonial Society  1958-1960 .

Amandus Johnson Papers
Originally deposited at the Balch Institute, the Amandus Johnson Papers, including correspondence, manuscripts, organizational records and research materials, are available for research use at the Historical Society of Pennsylvania.

Selected bibliography
The Swedish Settlements on the Delaware Volume I: Their History and Relation to the Indians, Dutch and English, 1638-1664 (1911)
The Swedes in America 1638-1900: Vol. I,  The Swedes on the Delaware 1638-1664. (1914)
Johan Classon Rising: The last governor of New Sweden (1915)
The Indians and Their Culture as Described in Swedish and Dutch Records (1917)
The Swedish Settlements on the Delaware 1638-1664, Volume 2 (1927)
Instruction For Johan Printz, Governor Of New Sweden, "The First Constitution or Supreme Law Of The States Of Pennsylvania And Delaware.  (1930)
Mbundu English-Portuguese dictionary: With grammar and syntax (1931)
The Journal and Biography of Nicholas Collin 1746-1831 (1936)
Swedish contributions to American freedom, 1776-1783: Including a sketch of the background of the Revolution, together with an account of the engagements (1953)

References

Other sources
Benson, Adolph B.; Naboth Hedin Swedes in America, 1638-1938 (Swedish American Tercentenary Association. 1938)

External links

American Swedish Historic Museum website
The Swedish Colonial Society website

1877 births
1974 deaths
People from Emmaboda Municipality
20th-century American historians
Gustavus Adolphus College alumni
University of Colorado alumni
University of Pennsylvania alumni
University of Pennsylvania faculty
Swedish emigrants to the United States
Burials at Gloria Dei (Old Swedes') Church
20th-century American male writers
American male non-fiction writers